A play is a work of drama, usually consisting mostly of dialogue between characters and intended for theatrical performance rather than just reading. The writer of a play is called a playwright. 

Plays are performed at a variety of levels, from London's West End and Broadway in New York City – which are the highest level of commercial theatre in the English-speaking world – to regional theatre, to community theatre, as well as university or school productions. A stage play is a play performed and written to be performed on stage rather than broadcast or made into a movie. Stage plays are those performed on any stage before an audience.  There are rare dramatists, notably George Bernard Shaw, who have had little preference as to whether their plays were performed or read. The term "play" can refer to both the written texts of playwrights and to their complete theatrical performance.

Comedy 

Comedies are plays which are designed to be humorous. Comedies are often filled with witty remarks, unusual characters, and strange circumstances. Certain comedies are geared toward different age groups. Comedies were one of the two original play types of Ancient Greece, along with tragedies. An example of a comedy would be William Shakespeare's play A Midsummer Night's Dream, or for a more modern example the skits from Saturday Night Live.

Farce 

A generally nonsensical genre of play, farces are often acted and often involve  humor. An example of a farce includes William Shakespeare's play The Comedy of Errors, or Mark Twain's play Is He Dead?.

Satirical 

A satire play takes a comic look at current events, while at the same time attempting to make a political or social statement, for example pointing out corruption. An example of a satire would be Nikolai Gogol's The Government Inspector and Aristophanes' Lysistrata. Satire plays are generally one of the most popular forms of comedy, and often considered to be their own genre entirely.

Restoration comedy 

Restoration comedy is a genre that explored relationships between men and women, and was considered risqué in its time. Characters featured in restoration comedy included stereotypes of all kinds, and these same stereotypes were found in most plays of this genre, so much so that most plays were very similar in message and content.  However, since restoration comedy dealt with unspoken aspects of relationships, it created a type of connection between audience and performance that was more informal and private.

It is commonly agreed that restoration comedy has origins in Molière’s theories of comedy, but differs in intention and tone.  The inconsistency between restoration comedy’s morals and the morals of the era is something that often arises during the study of this genre.  This may give clues as to why, despite its original success, restoration comedy did not last long in the seventeenth century.  However, in recent years, it has become a topic of interest for theatre theorists, who have been looking into theatre styles that have their own conventions of performance.

Tragedy 

These plays contain darker themes such as death and disaster. Often the protagonist of the play has a tragic flaw, a trait which leads to their downfall. Tragic plays convey all emotions and have very dramatic conflicts. Tragedy was one of the two original play types of Ancient Greece. Some examples of tragedies include William Shakespeare's Hamlet, and also John Webster's play The Duchess of Malfi.

Historical 

These plays focus on actual historical events. They can be tragedies or comedies, but are often neither of these. History as a separate genre was popularised by William Shakespeare. Examples of historical plays include Friedrich Schiller's Demetrius and Shakespeare's King John.

Musical theatre 

Ballad opera, a popular theatre style at the time, was the first style of musical to be performed in the American colonies.  The first musical of American origin was premiered in Philadelphia in 1767, and was called “The Disappointment”, however, this play never made it to production.

Modern Western musical theatre emerged in the Victorian era, with many structural elements established by the works of Gilbert and Sullivan in Britain and those of Harrigan and Hart in America. Around the 1920s, theatre styles were beginning to be defined more clearly.  For musical theatre, this meant that composers gained the right to create every song in the play, and these new plays were held to more specific conventions, such as thirty-two-bar songs.  When the Great Depression came, many people left Broadway for Hollywood, and the atmosphere of Broadway musicals changed significantly. A similar situation occurred during the 1960s, when composers were scarce and musicals lacked vibrancy and entertainment value.

By the 1990s, there were very few original Broadway musicals, as many were recreations of movies or novels.

Musical productions have songs to help explain the story and move the ideas of the play along. They are usually accompanied by dancing. Musicals can be very elaborate in settings and actor performances. Examples of musical productions include Wicked and Fiddler on the Roof.

Theatre of Cruelty 
This theatre style originated in the 1940s when Antonin Artaud hypothesised about the effects of expressing through the body as opposed to “by socially conditioned thought.”  In 1946, he wrote a preface to his works in which he explained how he came to write what and the way he did.

Above all, Artaud did not trust language as a means of communication.  Plays within the genre of theatre of cruelty are abstract in convention and content.  Artaud wanted his plays to have an effect and accomplish something.  His intention was to symbolise the subconscious through bodily performances, as he did not believe language could be effective.  Artaud considered his plays to be an enactment rather than a re-enactment, which meant he believed his actors were in reality, rather than re-enacting reality.

His plays dealt with heavy issues such as patients in psych wards, and Nazi Germany.  Through these performances, he wanted to “make the causes of suffering audible”, however, audiences originally reacted poorly, as they were so taken aback by what they saw.  Much of his work was banned in France at the time.

Artaud did not believe that conventional theatre of the time would allow the audience to have a cathartic experience and help heal the wounds of World War II.  For this reason, he moved towards radio-based theatre, in which the audience could use their imagination to connect the words they were hearing to their body.  This made his work much more personal and individualised, which he believed would increase the effectiveness of portraying suffering.

Theatre of the Absurd 
This genre generally includes metaphysical representations of existential qualms and questions.  Theatre of the absurd denies rationality, and embraces the inevitability of falling into the abyss of the human condition.  Instead of discussing these issues, however, theatre of the absurd is a demonstration of them.  This leaves the audience to discuss and question the content of the play for themselves.

One of the main aspects of theatre of the absurd is the physical contradiction to language.  Oftentimes, the dialogue between characters will directly oppose their actions.

Famous playwrights within this genre include Samuel Beckett, Jean-Paul Sartre, Eugène Ionesco, Arthur Adamov, and Jean Genet.

Terminology
The term "play" can be either a general term, or more specifically refer to a non-musical play. Sometimes the term "straight play" is used in contrast to "musical", which refers to a play based on music, dance, and songs sung by the play's characters. For a short play, the term "playlet" is sometimes used.

The term "script" refers to the written text of the play. After the front matter, such as title and author, it conventionally begins with a dramatis personae: a list presenting each of the main characters of the play by name, followed by a brief characterisation (e.g., ", a drunken Butler".)

For a musical play (opera, light opera, or musical) the term "libretto" is commonly used, instead of "script".

A play is usually divided into acts, similar to what chapters are in a novel. A short play may consist of only a single act, and then is called a "one-acter". Acts are subdivided into scenes. Each scene is set at one specified location, indicated in the script at the start of the scene (e.g., ". Changing locations usually requires changing the scenery, which takes time – even if merely a painted backdrop – and can only be done between scenes.

Next to the text to be spoken by the actors, a script contains "stage directions" (not to be confused with the use of that term in blocking, the staging of actors with specified movements across the stage). The most common type is for the entering and exiting of actors, e.g. Other stage directions may indicate the manner of delivery of the text, like "[Aside]" or "[Sings]", or indicate sounds to be produced off-stage, like "[Thunder]".

See also

 Canovaccio
 Closet drama
 Drama
 Dramatis personæ
 Playwright
 Staged reading
 Theatre
 History of theatre
 Screenplay
 Musical theatre

Lists
 List of basic theatre topics
 List of American plays
 List of Canadian plays
 List of Romanian plays
 List of films based on stage plays or musicals
 List of plays made into feature films

References

External links 

 
 
Performing arts
Plays
Fiction forms